This is a list of the county governors (Fylkesmenn) of Oslo, Norway. Oslo was named Christiania and Kristiania throughout this entire period.

References

Oslo
County governors
History of Oslo